Farhaan Behardien (born 9 October 1983) is a South African former international cricketer who played ODIs and T20Is. On 10 January 2017, Behardien was appointed as the T20I captain for the Sri Lanka tour.

Early and domestic career
He also plays for Nashua Titans. He made both his first-class and List-A cricket debuts in the 2004–05 season. Behardien is an aggressive right-handed batsman and a useful bowler, as well as an athletic fielder.

In July 2009, Behardien travelled to Australia for a three-week tour with the South African emerging squad. He also represented South Africa at the 2009 Hong Kong Sixes tournament, where he hit a six of the final ball to lead South Africa to victory in the final against Hong Kong.

In the first half of the 2009 season Behardian played as an overseas player for Bovey Tracey. He had a role as coach of their under-13 side.

In May 2017, he was named T20 Challenge Player of the Season at Cricket South Africa's annual awards.

In June 2018, he was named in the squad for the Titans team for the 2018–19 season. In September 2018, he was named in the Titans' squad for the 2018 Abu Dhabi T20 Trophy. In the same month he also scored his 6,000th run in first-class cricket, batting for Titans in the 2018–19 CSA 4-Day Franchise Series.

In October 2018, he was named in Cape Town Blitz's squad for the first edition of the Mzansi Super League T20 tournament. In September 2019, he was named in the squad for the Nelson Mandela Bay Giants team for the 2019 Mzansi Super League tournament. In April 2021, he was named in Free State's squad, ahead of the 2021–22 cricket season in South Africa.

International career
He made his T20I debut for South Africa against India in early 2012. He scored 20* from 11 deliveries faced. Behardien also earned himself a place in the South African squad for the 2012 ICC World Twenty20. He played in the South African ODI squad in 2014. He played an important knock of 65*.

Retirement 
In December 2022, Behardien announced his retirement from international cricket. He expressed his decision putting a retirement note on Twitter.

References

External links

1983 births
Living people
South African Muslims
Cricketers from Johannesburg
South African cricketers
South Africa One Day International cricketers
South Africa Twenty20 International cricketers
Cricketers at the 2015 Cricket World Cup
Boland cricketers
Cape Town Blitz cricketers
Durham cricketers
Free State cricketers
Knights cricketers
Leicestershire cricketers
Nelson Mandela Bay Giants cricketers
Northerns cricketers
Punjab Kings cricketers
Titans cricketers
Western Province cricketers